The Albany Academy is an independent college preparatory day school for boys in Albany, New York, USA, enrolling students from Preschool (age 3) to Grade 12. It was established in 1813 by a charter signed by Mayor Philip Schuyler Van Rensselaer and the city council of Albany. In July 2007, the once separate Albany Academy and Albany Academy for Girls merged into The Albany Academies. Both schools retain much of their pre-merger tradition and character, and each continues to give diplomas under its own name.

History
The Albany Academy is the oldest day school for boys in the New York Capital Region. The Academy was chartered in March 1813 to educate the sons of Albany's political elite and rapidly growing merchant class. In the Census three years prior, Albany was the tenth-largest city in the United States, and would remain so through the 1850s due to the prominence of the Erie Canal.

Classes began within months after the charter was granted, offering a college preparatory track (including intensive study of Ancient Greek, and Latin) and an arithmetic-based track to prepare young men for Albany's role as a center of commerce. Two years later, in 1815, a purpose-built building was completed in present-day Academy Park, adjacent to the New York State Capitol. The Federal-style building, now known as the Old Academy and headquarters of the City School District of Albany, was designed by renowned Albany architect Philip Hooker. The building is listed in the National Register of Historic Places.

In 1870, in response to a lack of military preparation institutions in the north during the American Civil War, the Albany Academy adopted the Battalion Leadership Program, instructing the "cadets" in military procedure and the art of leadership. In 2005, the school ended compulsory involvement in the program in favor of a House-based leadership program commonly found in English preparatory schools. 

In 1931, the school moved from its original downtown building in present-day Academy Park to its current location on the corner of Hackett Boulevard and Academy Road, in the University Heights section of Albany. Designed by Marcus T. Reynolds in the neo-Georgian style, the building incorporates many elements of the Old Academy building, namely the main entryway and cupola. The school stands approximately two miles from the city center. The red-brick Academy building's marble cornerstone was laid by the then-governor of New York and future president Franklin D. Roosevelt. 

In 2005, The Albany Academy ended its longstanding Army JROTC program. 

In July 2007, the board of trustees announced that The Albany Academy and Albany Academy for Girls would merge into The Albany Academies.

Accreditation and memberships
The Albany Academies are accredited by the New York State Association of Independent Schools and recognized by the Regents of the State of New York.

Alumni

Government, law, business, and public policy

William Barnes Jr., chairman of the New York Republican State Committee and member of the Republican National Committee
T. Garry Buckley, 72nd Lieutenant Governor of Vermont.
John W. Causey, United States Representative from Delaware
Norton Chase, New York State Assemblyman and New York State Senator
E. Harold Cluett, U.S. Representative from New York
Andrew J. Colvin, district attorney of Albany County and New York State Senator
Edwin Corning, businessman, Lieutenant Governor of New York
Edwin Corning Jr., member of the New York State Assembly
Erastus Corning 2nd, Mayor of Albany from 1942 to 1983
Parker Corning, U.S. Representative from New York
Frederick A. Conkling, U.S. Representative from New York
Learned Hand, justice of the United States Court of Appeals for the Second Circuit, regarded as the most influential American jurist never to sit on the Supreme Court of the United States
Francis Hendricks, Mayor of Syracuse and president of the State Bank of Syracuse.
Abraham Lansing, lawyer, New York State Treasurer, and New York State Senator
James Campbell Matthews, attorney and judge, New York's first African-American law school graduate
Roger McNamee, venture capital and private equity investor, founder of Elevation Partners and Silver Lake Partners
Peter P. Murphy, physician and politician
Stephen P. Nash, lawyer, president of the New York City Bar Association
Frederic P. Olcott, banker, stock broker, and New York State Comptroller
 Rufus Wheeler Peckham, Associate Justice of the Supreme Court of the United States on the  Supreme Court of the United States (1895–1909)
Wheeler Hazard Peckham, lawyer, U.S. Supreme Court nominee
John V. L. Pruyn, U.S. Representative from New York
William Gorham Rice, New York state government official, U.S. Civil Service Commissioner
Henry M. Sage, New York State Assemblyman and New York State Senator
Charles Emory Smith, U.S. Minister to Russia (1890–1892), U.S. Postmaster General (1898–1902)
Phillip Steck, Democratic member of the New York State Assembly
Peter G. Ten Eyck, U.S. Representative from New York
John Boyd Thacher II, Mayor of Albany from 1926 to 1941
Ralph W. Thomas, New York State Senator
Charles Tracey, U.S. Representative from New York
Chauncey Vibbard, organizer of the New York Central Railroad and U.S. Representative from New York
Henry Waldron, U.S. Representative from Michigan
Charles W. van Rensselaer first officer and paymaster aboard the  when it was lost during a hurricane in September 1857

Medicine and academia
John Seiler Brubacher, author, educational philosopher, Yale University professor
Andrew Sloan Draper, jurist, author, and president of the University of Illinois
William Durden, president of Dickinson College
Henry Hun, physician and professor of nervous diseases at the Albany Medical College
Jesse Montgomery Mosher, physician credited with establishing the first psychiatric ward within the organization of a general hospital
Stewart Myers, Robert C. Merton Professor of Financial Economics at the MIT Sloan School of Management, coined the term real option
Douglas M. North, president of Alaska Pacific University and Prescott College, and head of school of The Albany Academies
Martin Seligman, psychologist at the University of Pennsylvania known for his work on learned helplessness and positive psychology
Horace Silliman, businessman, philanthropist, namesake of Silliman University
Howard Townsend, physician and medical professor
William Bell Wait, teacher in the New York Institute for the Education of the Blind who invented New York Point, a writing for the blind before Braille
Julian Gibbs, president of Amherst College

Literature and journalism

Luke Rhinehart (George Powers Cockcroft), author of The Dice Man
Gordon Ackerman, journalist, writer, and photographer
Stephen Vincent Benét, poet laureate, two-time winner of the Pulitzer Prize (1929, 1944)
William Rose Benét, poet laureate, winner of the Pulitzer Prize (1942)
Christopher Cuomo, Emmy Award-winning television journalist for CNN
Herman Melville, author of Moby-Dick
Andy Rooney, author, journalist, and commentator for 60 Minutes
Erik Wemple, journalist for The Washington Post
Isidor Lewi, on editorial board of New York Tribune

Science and technology
John Bogart, civil engineer and New York State Engineer and Surveyor
Verplanck Colvin, lawyer, author, illustrator, and topographical engineer involved in the creation of the Adirondack Park
Benjamin Boss, astronomer and editor of the Astronomical Journal
Joseph Henry, natural philosopher, telegraphy pioneer, first Curator of the Smithsonian Institution
Henry Ramsay, civil engineer and New York State Engineer and Surveyor

Arts, sports, and entertainment
Raymond Castellani, actor, Los Angeles philanthropist
James Carpinello, American film, television, and Broadway actor
Marc Cavosie, professional ice hockey player
Craig Darby, retired NHL ice hockey player
Joseph R. Grismer, Albany-born actor, playwright and theatrical producer
Stephen Hannock, landscape painter
Craig Hatkoff, co-founder of the Tribeca Film Festival and Tribeca Film Institute
Ashton Holmes, film and television actor best known for the role of Jack Stall in A History of Violence
David Holloway, American football linebacker formerly of the Arizona Cardinals
Michael Patrick Jann, director of the film Drop Dead Gorgeous and actor on MTV's The State
Kevin Leveille, professional lacrosse player for the Chicago Machine and the Chicago Shamrox
Mike Leveille, lacrosse player, 2008 Tewaaraton Trophy winner, member of the Chicago Machine
Dion Lewis, professional football player for the New York Giants
Marcus T. Reynolds, architect and author
Merrick Thomson, professional lacrosse player for the Toronto Nationals and the Philadelphia Wings
Steve Wulf, executive editor at ESPN The Magazine
John Wyman, magician and ventriloquist

Military

Jacob Downing, Union Army officer during the American Civil War, early developer of the city of Denver.
Theodore Roosevelt Jr., U.S. Army brigadier general and Medal of Honor recipient
Jeff Sharlet, Vietnam Veteran, leader of the GI resistance movement during the Vietnam War
Charles Dwight Sigsbee, admiral in the U.S. Navy, captain of the  when it exploded, igniting the Spanish–American War
Frederick Townsend, Union officer in the American Civil War, Adjutant General of the State of New York
Robert Townsend, Civil War-era U.S. Navy captain commanding the ironclad 
Egbert Ludoricus Viele, brigadier general in the Union Army, military governor of Norfolk, Virginia; U.S. Representative from New York

Theology
Alphonsus J. Donlon, Roman Catholic priest and President of Georgetown University
Angus Dun, 4th Bishop of the Episcopal Diocese of Washington in Washington, DC
John Loughlin, 1st Bishop of Brooklyn, New York (1853–1891)
Clarence A. Walworth, attorney, writer, Roman Catholic priest, and missionary

Faculty/administration
Noted former faculty and administration include inventors, politicians, and seven college presidents, including four presidents of Amherst College:

George W. Atherton, president of the Pennsylvania State University
Simeon Baldwin, Mayor of New Haven, Connecticut, U.S. Representative, justice on the Superior Court of Connecticut
Theodric Romeyn Beck, forensic medicine pioneer
William Henry Campbell, president of Rutgers University
John Chester, the second president of Rensselaer Polytechnic Institute
George Hammell Cook, chemistry, geology professor, vice president of Rutgers University, director New Jersey Geological Survey
Merrill Edwards Gates, president of Amherst College and Rutgers University
Peter Gansevoort, member of the New York State Assembly and New York State Senate
Julian Gibbs, president of Amherst College
Joseph Henry, natural philosopher, telegraphy pioneer, first curator of the Smithsonian Institution
Albert Hull, physicist, inventor of the magnetron and dynatron
Alexander Meiklejohn, president of Amherst College, Dean of Brown University, winner of the Presidential Medal of Freedom
David Murray, American educator and government adviser in Meiji period Japan, professor, Rutgers University
George Olds, president of Amherst College
Charles Emory Smith, U.S. Minister to Russia (1890–1892), U.S. Postmaster General (1898–1902)
Frederick Townsend, Union officer in the American Civil War, Adjutant General of the State of New York (1857–1861, 1880)

See also
Albany Academy for Girls
The Albany Academies
Old Albany Academy Building

References

External links

The Albany Academies

1813 establishments in New York (state)
Boys' schools in New York (state)
Education in Albany, New York
Educational institutions established in 1813
Preparatory schools in New York (state)
Private elementary schools in New York (state)
Private high schools in Albany County, New York
Private middle schools in New York (state)
School buildings on the National Register of Historic Places in New York (state)
National Register of Historic Places in Albany, New York
Organizations based in Albany, New York